Blue Bell Hill is a chalk hill in the English county of Kent.

Blue Bell Hill may also refer to:

 Blue Bell Hill (Pennsylvania), a neighborhood in Philadelphia, Pennsylvania, United States
 Blue Bell Hill (village), a village in Kent, England

See also
 Bluebell Hill transmitting station
 Blue Bell (disambiguation)
 Bell Hill (disambiguation)
 Blue Hill (disambiguation)